Wooleytown is a ghost town in Richland Township, Miami County, in the U.S. state of Indiana.

History
Wooleytown was founded in 1846 by Amos Wooley, and others. The Lake Erie and Western Railroad being built two miles away from the community and the founding of the nearby town of Denver led to Wooleytown becoming a ghost town.

References

External links
 

Geography of Miami County, Indiana
Ghost towns in Indiana